Saint Christopher (Hágios Christóphoros) is venerated by several Catholic denominations as a martyr killed in the reign of the 3rd-century Roman emperor Decius (reigned 249–251) or alternatively under the emperor Maximinus Daia (reigned 308–313). There appears to be confusion due to the similarity in names "Decius" and "Daia". Churches and monasteries were named after him by the 7th century.

His most famous legend tells that he carried a child, who was unknown to him, across a river before the child revealed himself as Christ. Therefore, he is the patron saint of travelers, and small images of him are often worn around the neck, on a bracelet, carried in a pocket, or placed in vehicles by Christians.

Historicity 
Probably the most important source of the historicity of Christophorus is a stone inscription published by Louis Duchesne in 1878.

The copy of the stone inscription and the first publication took place on 7 April 1877 by Matthieu Paranikas in the Anatolia magazine in Constantinople.
The stone of the size of 2 x 1 m was found in the ruins of a church in the ancient Chalcedon.
The inscription bears witness to the laying of the foundation stone, the construction and the consecration of a church in the name of ‘Saint Christopher’s Martyrdom.’
The inscription also bears witness to the chronological dates from the laying of the foundation stone to the consecration of the church; the construction of this Christophorus church dates back exactly to the time of the 4th Ecumenical Council, the Council of Chalcedon.
The inscription also mentions the names of the state ministers of the Byzantine Empire and those church ministers who were involved in the laying of the foundation stone, the construction or the consecration of the church.
The inscription reads as follows:

The German archaeologist Carl Maria Kaufmann writes:

Not far from the Church of St Christopher, which was under construction at the time, was the Basilica of St Euphemia, in which the Council took place; the consuls Protogenes and Sporacius, mentioned in the stone inscription, are mentioned in the Council Acts.

This inscription attests to the veneration of Christophorus in the 5th century in Chalcedony and, consequently, the existence of Christophorus, who probably in the period of the Great Persecution in the 4th century suffered the martyrdom.

Then for the year 553 a bishop of Arkadiopolis in Lydia is testified, who had taken the name Christophorus. A nunnery in Galatia was consecrated to Saint Christopher around the year 600.

Epic 
Epics about the life and death of Saint Christopher first appeared in Greece in the 6th century and had spread to France by the 9th century. The 11th-century bishop and poet Walter of Speyer gave one version, but the most popular variations originated from the 13th-century Golden Legend.

According to the legendary account of his life Christopher was initially called . He was a Canaanite, 5 cubits tall and with a fearsome face. While serving the king of Canaan, he took it into his head to go and serve "the greatest king there was". He went to the king who was reputed to be the greatest, but one day he saw the king cross himself at the mention of the devil. On thus learning that the king feared the devil, he departed to look for the devil. He came across a band of marauders, one of whom declared himself to be the devil, so Christopher decided to serve him. But when he saw his new master avoid a wayside cross and found out that the devil feared Christ, he left him and enquired from people where to find Christ. He met a hermit who instructed him in the Christian faith. Christopher asked him how he could serve Christ. When the hermit suggested fasting and prayer, Christopher replied that he was unable to perform that service. The hermit then suggested that because of his size and strength Christopher could serve Christ by assisting people to cross a dangerous river, where they were perishing in the attempt. The hermit promised that this service would be pleasing to Christ.

After Christopher had performed this service for some time, a little child asked him to take him across the river. During the crossing, the river became swollen and the child seemed as heavy as lead, so much that Christopher could scarcely carry him and found himself in great difficulty. When he finally reached the other side, he said to the child: "You have put me in the greatest danger. I do not think the whole world could have been as heavy on my shoulders as you were." The child replied: "You had on your shoulders not only the whole world but Him who made it. I am Christ your king, whom you are serving by this work." The child then vanished.

Christopher later visited Lycia and there comforted the Christians who were being martyred. Brought before the local king, he refused to sacrifice to the pagan gods. The king tried to win him by riches and by sending two beautiful women to tempt him. Christopher converted the women to Christianity, as he had already converted thousands in the city. The king ordered him to be killed. Various attempts failed, but finally Christopher was beheaded.

The Greek name  means "Christ bearer".

Veneration and patronage

Eastern Orthodox liturgy
The Eastern Orthodox Church venerates Christopher of Lycea (or Lycia) with a Feast Day on May 9. The liturgical reading and hymns refer to his imprisonment by Decius who tempts Christopher with harlots before ordering his beheading. The Kontakion in the Fourth Tone (hymn) reads:

Thou who wast terrifying both in strength and in countenance, for thy Creator's sake thou didst surrender thyself willingly to them that sought thee; for thou didst persuade both them and the women that sought to arouse in thee the fire of lust, and they followed thee in the path of martyrdom. And in torments thou didst prove to be courageous. Wherefore, we have gained thee as our great protector, O great Christopher.

Roman Catholic liturgy
The Roman Martyrology remembers him on 25 July. The Tridentine Calendar commemorated him on the same day only in private Masses. By 1954 his commemoration had been extended to all Masses, but it was dropped in 1970 as part of the general reorganization of the calendar of the Roman rite as mandated by the motu proprio, Mysterii Paschalis. His commemoration was described to be not of Roman tradition, in view of the relatively late date (about 1550) and limited manner in which it was accepted into the Roman calendar, but his feast continues to be observed locally.

Relics
The Museum of Sacred Art at Saint Justine's Church (Sveta Justina) in Rab, Croatia claims a gold-plated reliquary holds the skull of St. Christopher. According to church tradition, a bishop showed the relics from the city wall in 1075 in order to end a siege of the city by an Italo-Norman army.

Medals

Devotional medals with St. Christopher's name and image are commonly worn as pendants, especially by travelers, to show devotion and as a request for his blessing. Miniature statues are frequently displayed in automobiles. In French a widespread phrase for such medals is "Regarde St Christophe et va-t-en rassuré" ("Look at St Christopher and go on reassured", sometimes translated as "Behold St Christopher and go your way in safety"); Saint Christopher medals and holy cards in Spanish have the phrase "Si en San Cristóbal confías, de accidente no morirás" ("If you trust St. Christopher, you won't die in an accident").

General patronage
St. Christopher is a widely popular saint, especially revered by athletes, mariners, ferrymen, and travelers. He is revered as one of the Fourteen Holy Helpers. He holds patronage of things related to travel and travelers—against lightning and pestilence—and patronage for archers; bachelors; boatmen; soldiers; bookbinders; epilepsy; floods; fruit dealers; fullers; gardeners; a holy death; mariners; market carriers; motorists and drivers; sailors; storms; surfers; toothache; mountaineering; and transportation workers.

Patronage of places
Christopher is the patron saint of many places, including: Baden, Germany; Barga, Italy; Brunswick, Germany; Mecklenburg, Germany; Rab, Croatia; Roermond, the Netherlands; Saint Christopher's Island (Saint Kitts); Toses, Catalonia, Spain; Mondim de Basto, Portugal; Agrinio, Greece; Vilnius, Lithuania; Riga, Latvia; Havana, Cuba; San Cristóbal, Dominican Republic; Paete, Laguna, Philippines; and Tivim, Goa, India.

Depictions in art
Because St. Christopher offered protection to travelers and against sudden death, many churches placed images or statues of him, usually opposite the south door, so he could be easily seen. He is usually depicted as a giant, with a child on his shoulder and a staff in one hand. In England, there are more wall paintings of St. Christopher than of any other saint; in 1904, Mrs. Collier, writing for the British Archaeological Association, reported 183 paintings, statues, and other representations of the saint, outnumbering all others except for the Virgin Mary.

In the Eastern Orthodox Church, certain icons covertly identify Saint Christopher with the head of a dog. Such images may carry echoes of the Egyptian dog-headed god, Anubis. Christopher pictured with a dog's head is not generally supported by the Orthodox Church, as the icon was proscribed in the 18th century by Moscow.

The roots of that iconography lie in a hagiographic narrative set during the reign of the Emperor Diocletian, which tell of a man named Reprebus, Rebrebus or Reprobus (the "reprobate" or "scoundrel") being captured by Roman forces fighting against tribes dwelling to the west of Egypt in Cyrenaica and forced to join the Roman numerus Marmaritarum or "Unit of the Marmaritae", which suggests an otherwise-unidentified "Marmaritae" (perhaps the same as the Marmaricae Berber tribe of Cyrenaica).  He was reported to be of enormous size, with the head of a dog instead of a man, both apparently being typical of the Marmaritae. He and the unit were later transferred to Syrian Antioch, where bishop Peter of Attalia baptised him and where he was martyred in 308. It has also been speculated that this Byzantine depiction of St. Christopher as dog-headed may have resulted from a misreading of the Latin term Cananeus (Canaanite) as caninus, that is, "canine". Roman writer Pliny the Elder also reported that the “Cynamolgi (or Cynocephali), of ‘Ethiopia’ were men with the heads of dogs.” Pliny’s work was a well respected compendium of Roman science - The Natural Historica-  during the first century A.D. In it, there is reported accepted “knowledge” about people from the area of Western Egypt (Cyrenaica). Pliny notes that these “dog-headed men” resided in “Ethiopia” -a name used to encapsulate areas of Africa West and South of Alexandrian Egypt by contemporary Romans.  It’s more likely that the iconography roots lie in a narrative of a “Rebrebus/Rebrebus/ or Reprobus”  captured out of “West Egypt” (a Cynocephali of Cyrenaica) and matching the current cultural belief that men (tall, strong, reprobates) from that area simply had dog heads.

According to the medieval Irish Passion of St. Christopher, "This Christopher was one of the Dog-heads, a race that had the heads of dogs and ate human flesh." It was commonly accepted at the time that there were several types of races, the Cynocephalus, or dog-headed people, being one of many believed to populate the world.

The German bishop and poet Walter of Speyer portrayed St. Christopher as a giant of a cynocephalic species in the land of the Chananeans who ate human flesh and barked. Eventually, Christopher met the Christ child, regretted his former behavior, and received baptism. He, too, was rewarded with a human appearance, whereupon he devoted his life to Christian service and became an athlete of God, one of the soldier saints.

St. Christopher's "gigantic tooth"
In the Late Middle Ages, a claimed large tooth of St. Christopher was delivered to the church in Vercelli. Pilgrims came from all over Europe to look at this relic until the end of 18th century when a naturalist determined it was a tooth of hippopotamus. Since then, the tooth has been removed from the altar and forbidden to be venerated.

Paintings

In popular culture
 See Saint Christopher in popular culture

Honours
Numerous places are named for the saint, including Saint Christopher Island, the official name of the Caribbean island of Saint Kitts, and St. Christopher Island in Antarctica.  Many places are named after the saint in other languages, including Saint-Christophe, a common place name, particularly in France; San Cristóbal; and São Cristóvão.

See also

 Acts of Andrew and Bartholomew
 Cynocephaly
 List of saints
 Statue of Saint Christopher, Charles Bridge
 Cedalion for a slightly similar classical myth.

References

Further reading

External links 

 Saint Christopher—Website with information and references about St. Christopher
 "The Life of Saint Christopher", The Golden Legend or Lives of the Saints, Temple Classics, 1931 (Compiled by Jacobus de Voragine, translated by William Caxton) at the Fordham University Medieval Sourcebook
 Saint Christopher at the Christian Iconography web site
 St. Christopher in the Golden Legend: Latin original, English translation (Caxton)
 Irish "Passion of St. Christopher"
 Saint Christopher engraved by E. Sadeler from the De Verda Collection
 Understanding the dog headed Icon of Saint Christopher at Orthodox Arts Journal.
 

251 deaths
3rd-century Christian martyrs
Dogs in religion
Fourteen Holy Helpers
Giants
Military saints
Mythological human hybrids
People whose existence is disputed
Saints from the Holy Land